Erwin Konrad Eduard Bumke (7 July 1874 – 20 April 1945) was the last president of the Reichsgericht, the supreme civil and criminal court of the German Reich, serving from 1929 to 1945. As such, he should according to the Weimar Constitution have succeeded Paul von Hindenburg as the President of Germany upon the latter's death in August 1934 and thus the Head of State of Nazi Germany. The Law on the Head of State of the German Reich, passed by the Nazi-controlled Reichstag, unconstitutionally prevented that by combining the presidency with the chancellorship, making Adolf Hitler the undisputed Führer of Germany.

Life
Born in the small town of Stolp in the Prussian Province of Pomerania (now Słupsk, Poland), he had a family that was middle class. His father was a doctor and his mother a factory owner's daughter. His brother Oswald Bumke (1877–1950) became a noted psychiatrist.

After studying law in Freiburg, Leipzig, Munich, Berlin and Greifswald, Bumke began his career as a judge in Essen. In 1907, he assumed an office in the Reichsjustizamt, the precursor of the later Reich Ministry of Justice. The same year, he married Eva von Merkatz (1873–1947), the aunt of the later Minister of Justice Hans-Joachim von Merkatz. The couple had two sons, both of whom were killed in World War II. Bumke himself served as an officer in World War I, achieving the rank of Hauptmann (Captain).

After the war, Bumke joined the German National People's Party (DNVP). He quickly rose to the head of Department II in the newly-established Ministry of Justice, which was concerned with criminal law. He prepared, among other things, the Reichstag drafts for a new Strafgesetzbuch penal code in 1927, which never saw the light of day. In 1930, Bumke became president of the International Criminal Law and Prison Commission. 

Upon the resignation of Walter Simons in 1929, Bumke was appointed as head of the Reichsgericht by President Paul von Hindenburg. On 25 October 1932, the court under Bumke's leadership, declared the temporary removal of the Prussian state ministers' authority by a Reichskommissar, enacted by emergency decree (see Preußenschlag), to be valid. According to an amendment to the Weimar Constitution passed in December 1932, Bumke would have been the deputy of the Reichspräsident as head of state, if the latter suffered a handicap or death, but no such incapacitation on his part was ever shown to be the case and the regulation was plainly ignored when Hindenburg died two years later.

As a national conservative, Bumke, like Minister of Justice Franz Gürtner and State Secretary Franz Schlegelberger, retained his office after the Nazi seizure of power in January 1933 and was made responsible for co-ordinating jurisprudence in the Third Reich. In July 1933, he became a SS Patron Member. He joined the Nazi Party in 1937 and was awarded the Golden Party Badge the next year. Bumke became responsible for several unjust and racist verdicts: as presiding judge of the 3rd criminal division, he ruled under the Rassenschande paragraphs of the Nuremberg Laws. He also was involved in retroactive legalizing the "euthanasia" murders of the Aktion T4 programme in 1939–1941. His term in office was extended by the personal decree of Adolf Hitler in 1939.

During the last days of World War II, on 20 April 1945 (Hitler's birthday), two days after US Army forces entered Leipzig, Bumke committed suicide.

Works
 Hat die erfüllte Resolutivbedingung dingliche Kraft?, Greifswald dissertation 1896
 Deutsches Gefängniswesen. Ein Handbuch, Berlin 1928.
 Gerichtsverfassungsgesetz und Strafprozeßordnung. Mit Nebengesetzen in der vom 13. Januar 1927 geltenden Fassung; Textausgabe mit einer Einführung in die Vorschriften der Novelle vom 27. Dezember 1926, Berlin 1927.
 Zwei Entscheidungen zu Art. 48 der Reichsverfassung, Berlin 1932.

Further reading

External links
 

1874 births
1945 suicides
People from Słupsk
People from the Province of Pomerania
German National People's Party politicians
Nazi Party politicians
Förderndes Mitglied der SS
Nazi Party officials
Nazis who committed suicide in Germany
Judges in the Nazi Party
German Army personnel of World War I